Nambivayal is a village in the Pattukkottai taluk of Thanjavur district, Tamil Nadu, India.

Demographics 

As per the 2001 census, Nambivayal had a total population of 2200 with 1086 males and 1114 females. The sex ratio was 1026. The literacy rate was 71.74.

References 

Villages in Thanjavur district